The following is a list of events affecting Mexican television in 2017. Events listed include television show debuts, finales, and cancellations; channel launches, closures, and re-brandings; stations changing or adding their network affiliations; and information about controversies and carriage disputes.

Events 
January - The broadcast facility of defunct station XHK-TV in La Paz, Baja California Sur is demolished.
31 May - In Tijuana, Baja California, XETV-TDT ends its 64-year-long history of providing English-language programming to the Tijiana-San Diego borderplex area when the area's affiliation with The CW in the United States moved to San Diego-based KFMB-DT2, and XETV's Canal 5 affiliation moving to the main channel while discontinuing its second digital subchannel upon the switch.

Television programs

Debuts 
40 y 20 (2016–present) 
El Chiapo (2017–present) 
Ingobernable (2017-201?)
Sin tu mirads (2017–present)

Miniseries 
The Day I Met El Chiapo

Programs on-air

1970s
Plaza Sesamo (1972–present)

1990s
Acapulco Bay (1995–present) 
Corazon salvaje (1993–present) 
Esmeralda (1997–present) 
La usurpadora (1998–present)

2000s
Alma de hierro (2008–present) 
Big Brother México (2002-2005, 2015–present)
Hotel Erotica Cabo (2006–present) 
Lo Que Callamos Las Mujeres (2001–present)

2010s 
40 y 20 (2016–present) 
Como dice el dicho (2011–present) 
El Chiapo (2017–present) 
La Voz… México (2011–present) 
México Tiene Talento (2014–present)  
Sin tu mirads (2017–present) 
Valiant Love (2012–present)

Television stations

Station launches

Network affiliation changes

Station closures

Deaths

See also
List of Mexican films of 2017
2017 in Mexico

References